Akash Singh (born 26 April 2002) is an Indian cricketer who plays for Nagaland in domestic cricket and Rajasthan Royals in Indian Premier League.

Career
Akash made his Twenty20 debut on 9 November 2019, for Rajasthan in the 2019–20 Syed Mushtaq Ali Trophy. Prior to his Twenty20 debut, he represented the India under-19 cricket team in the 2019 ACC Under-19 Asia Cup in September 2019, playing in three matches during the tournament. He was also called up to the India B cricket team for the U19 Challenger Cup. In December 2019, he was named in India's squad for the 2020 Under-19 Cricket World Cup.

In the 2020 IPL auction, he was bought by the Rajasthan Royals ahead of the 2020 Indian Premier League but was released before the next auction. In February 2021, Singh was bought again by the Rajasthan Royals in the IPL auction ahead of the 2021 Indian Premier League. He made his List A debut on 23 February 2021, for Rajasthan in the 2020–21 Vijay Hazare Trophy.

References

External links
 

2002 births
Living people
Indian cricketers
Rajasthan cricketers
Place of birth missing (living people)